This is a list of Ciconiiformes species by global population. While numbers are estimates, they have been made by the experts in their fields. For more information on how these estimates were ascertained, see Wikipedia's articles on population biology and population ecology.

This list is incomprehensive, as not all Ciconiiformes have had their numbers quantified. The classification of this order of birds is currently in flux; the classification for this list is aligned with the IUCN's current position, but may change in the future.

Species by global population

See also
 
Lists of birds by population
Lists of organisms by population

References

Birds
Ciconiiformes